= Flatware =

Flatware may refer to:

- Cutlery and silverware for serving and eating food at the dining table
- Tableware that is open-shaped, such as plates, dishes and bowls
